Juan Manrique García (born August 26, 1967 in Matanzas, Cuba) is a Cuban baseball player and Olympic gold and silver medalist.

Manrique is a one time Gold medalist for baseball, winning at the 1996 Summer Olympics. He also won a Silver medal at the 2000 Summer Olympics for baseball.

Manrique also played for the Cuba national team in the 1999 Baltimore Orioles–Cuba national baseball team exhibition series.

References 
 
 

1967 births
Living people
Olympic baseball players of Cuba
Olympic silver medalists for Cuba
Olympic gold medalists for Cuba
Olympic medalists in baseball
Medalists at the 1996 Summer Olympics
Medalists at the 2000 Summer Olympics
Baseball players at the 2000 Summer Olympics
Baseball players at the 1996 Summer Olympics
Pan American Games gold medalists for Cuba
Baseball players at the 1995 Pan American Games
Baseball players at the 1999 Pan American Games
Pan American Games medalists in baseball
Central American and Caribbean Games gold medalists for Cuba
Competitors at the 1998 Central American and Caribbean Games
Central American and Caribbean Games medalists in baseball
Medalists at the 1995 Pan American Games
Medalists at the 1999 Pan American Games
20th-century Cuban people